The Houston Wild Riders was a team of the National Indoor Football League (NIFL) scheduled to begin play in 2007.  The team disappeared before the final schedule was made.

Season-By-Season 

|-
|2007 || -- || -- || -- || -- || --

External links
Official website

National Indoor Football League teams
Wild Riders
Defunct American football teams in Texas
American football teams established in 2006
American football teams disestablished in 2007
2006 establishments in Texas
2007 disestablishments in Texas
Pasadena, Texas